Gwa is one of the Bantu languages spoken in Nigeria.

References

Jarawan languages
Languages of Nigeria